An 0-8-6, in the Whyte notation for the classification of steam locomotives by wheel arrangement, is a locomotive with no leading wheels, eight driving wheels (4 axles) fixed in a rigid frame, and six trailing wheels (normally mounted in a trailing truck). Examples of this type of locomotive were built by Wilhelm von Engerth.

Equivalent classification
Other equivalent classifications are:
UIC classification: D3 (also known as German classification and Italian classification)
French classification: 043

References

8,0-8-6